Juhi Dewangan (born 25 May 1994) is an Indian badminton player.

Achievements

BWF International Challenge/Series 
Mixed doubles

  BWF International Challenge tournament
  BWF International Series tournament
  BWF Future Series tournament

References

External links
 

Living people
1994 births
Indian female badminton players
20th-century Indian women
21st-century Indian women